is a Japanese manga created by Masahiko Takajo and Tetsuya Saruwatari and later adapted to two OVAs and a live-action film named Riki-Oh: The Story of Ricky.

The story is about a young man who has learned the art of Qigong from one of Chiang Kai-shek's bodyguards and has become so strong that he can punch holes through people and solid objects. It was serialized in Business Jump from 1987 to 1990 and later published in 12 volumes.

Outside Japan, it was translated and published only in Hong Kong by Comicsworld in nine volumes.
The only difference between the two editions, besides the different number of pages in each volume, is the absence of the short stories "Kirinji" and "N.Y. Dust", which are unrelated to Riki-Oh, in the Hong Kong edition.

Plot
The story is set in a post-apocalyptic future where global warming and warfare has left the world struggling, while Japan descended into an economic depression in the 1990s which led to increased crime.

The story centers around Saiga Riki-Oh, blessed with inhuman strength, who, after taking revenge against a yakuza who was responsible for the death of a child who befriended him, ends up in a maximum security prison owned by a private organization. The story follows Riki and his search for his little brother Saiga Nachi, who bears a manji symbol on his right hand and also possesses superhuman strength.

Riki-Oh encounters and battles many deadly opponents with either superhuman strength or martial arts during his travel for avenging his mother and finding his brother.

Characters

The titular antihero of the story, he was separated from his younger brother Nachi since childhood and was adopted by the affluent Saiga family, and grew up to be a very violent person and has a vicious temper and prefers to be alone, because of this he is referred to as a "Wolf". Despite this however, he hides a softer side of kindness and sympathy. He also has a strong belief in karma and shows ruthlessness towards evil doers. Riki-Oh is shown to be a muscular man with fairly long flowing hair. His most distinguishing features are five bullet wounds on his chest and a scar which is the Hexagram or Star of David on his right hand which is the source of his great strength and skill. This scar is also a sign that he's destined to overthrow his biological father, and it gives him powers such as superhuman strength, enough to rip the human body apart with little effort, alongside punches can rip holes in peoples' bodies and injure them with the air pressure created by them. He is also trained in the art of Naike Kenpou, taught to him by his old master, Chou Zenki.

The main antagonist and younger brother of Riki-Oh who has a cold glare, longer hair, lesser muscles, and has had a scar in the shape of a manji (swastika) on his right hand since birth. He has great resentment towards his brother for abandoning him, as well as also believing that when humans die they are relieved from pain and suffering through a mercy killing. While Nachi is gifted with strong psychokinesis, the ability to manipulate, or "communicate with", objects and matter with the mind. The source of these powers is his swastika hand and head. He is also able to use energy blasts, possibly ki, that can disintegrate human bodies, however Riki-Oh's hexagram scarred hand can deflect these blasts. Even though Nachi primarily uses his powers to massacre his victims, he is also shown to be able to use them to heal others; he is said to have healed fighters at the Pankration before, and restores a young child's ability to walk during the Cape Arc.

An android that resembles Riki-Oh in appearance constructed by Obinata. It was sent on a mission to kill Riki-Oh but, after a long fight in a wood, it was accidentally sucked into quicksand with Riki-Oh with the latter surviving after having carved a shelter in the abdomen of the android.

Aneyama looks like an effeminate, young homosexual. In reality he does a plastic surgery every month. Under his dresses however his body looks like that of a centenary man, all wrinkled. He is over 80 years old, due to his elderly age, he cannot fight normally. Instead, he makes use of his near infinite wealth and power to have monthly plastic surgeries and transplants of his failing vital organs. While he cannot fight directly, he makes use of a suit of high tech armor to greatly enhance his strength. His trump card is the ability to shoot bullets in such a pattern to sap all the strength of his enemies, as at this point in the series regular guns have little to no effect. His role in the story is being Mukai's right-hand man and personal killer, as well as a man of the Japanese government. He is one of the main antagonists of Riki-Oh, getting more screen time in the series than anyone else besides the titular character. A devout follower of Mukai, he goes out of his way to ensure Riki-Oh's capture to fulfill his plan to end the world, as well as his own twisted sexual desires. Hidden beneath his seemingly good manners, Aneyama is an extremely sadistic man and a sexual deviant. He can be considered the most brutal and perverse villain of the manga. In the second World War, he was Mukai's killer and he liked to brutally torture and kill people during their interrogations. He has a great knowledge of torture and execution methods. He is also a very spoiled man, and kills people that commit minor mistakes. For example, when he killed his butler Hirabayashi by activating a fan trap that minced him just because there was a hair floating in his tea. Or when he killed his attendant Moriura, even after he has shown his loyalty to him, by activating another trap that impaled him just because he uttered Aneyama's age. Ultimately, he is a pervert. Aneyama has terrible, unusual and inhuman habits, like bath on a pool filled with virgins' blood. He seems to hate very much Riki-Oh, jealous of his youth. For him, to be saved by Riki-Oh is the most humiliating thing. He is also scared by him. Aneyama won't tolerate failure, and will mercilessly kill anyone who make mistakes on his own job, just like did with Terashida, who failed to kill Riki-Oh five years early. Aneyama's aforementioned massive hatred for Riki-oh quickly grew, and has him tortured once he defeats him in his first direct battle in the best way he knows how - making him watch as he kills innocents, powerless to do anything. Aneyama is Mukai's primary enforcer and voice, carrying out the majority of his plan, given Mukai's insanity and the fact he barely ever leaves his base in Antarctica. The only person he truly values is his dead sister, the only woman he ever loved, whose death drove him to be a homosexual. He is willing to tolerate his second in command, Dr. Kohinata, largely due to how competent and useful he is, having made his power armor for him as well as many other useful inventions. He still treats Kohinata terribly regardless, but he is the only one he will not kill for a small mistake. Aneyama is somewhat similar to Frieza from the Dragon Ball manga series since both are extremely sadistic, both killed one or more parents of the hero, both killed one or more of their subordinates, both are spoiled brats and both were left them the opportunity to redeem themselves. Both were also saved by the hero one or more times, but they continue to try to kill their enemies.

A postal swordsman who wears what appears to be one of the khaki-green uniforms of the Imperial Japanese Army, which is a symbol of his high ranking authority as an officer. Washizaki's occupation is being the tyrannical leader of a new form of dictatorship and has complete control over a city that isn't marked on any map. His plan is to unleash nuclear weapons to bring forth the end of the world where only he and his close allies survive before repopulating the world in his perfect vision. His problem is that he relies on other villains to do this, such as Nachi and Mukai. Washizaki talks to one of his superiors, presumably Mukai or Aneyama, before he gets the impression that he is being betrayed given the fact that they want to take Nachi, his most important piece of his plan, as well as his daughter for seemingly no reason. This betrayal prompts Washizaki to go on a homicidal rampage by unreasonably slaughtering innocent lives - usually he at least requires them to mildly annoy him or fail him. Washizaki goes so insane that he puts on face paint and straps a pair of flashlights to his head in an imitation of the way candles are worn in certain Shinto rituals rather than his usual peaked cap. Due to Nachi's godlike powers, maggots are generated in Washizaki's flesh and they start tearing through his face during his fight with Riki-Oh, in order to push him even further in his madness. The prospect of being thrown away by Mukai makes him go so mad that he attempts to "deflower" his daughter before Mukai can, as this is the reason why he believes Mukai wants her. His ultimate goal at this point becomes to kill Nachi and to launch his nukes to interfere with Mukai's similar plan as much as possible out of a desire for revenge on him. Unfortunately for him, even if Riki-Oh wasn't around to stop his plans, Mukai could just reverse the effects of Washizkai's actions with time travel, though it is extremely doubtful Washizaki knows of this ability of Mukai. Washizaki is a much more skilled fighter before he goes insane, and he defeats Riki-Oh with a single sword strike the first time they meet. The sword in question is his ki infused katana, which is capable of cutting through anything. He is able to bring Riki-Oh to his knees a second time through use of Nachi and the other fights in the arena, after which he has Otto perform surgery on Riki-Oh to insert devices that can give Riki-Oh painful electric shocks whenever he disobeys him. With both Nachi and Riki-Oh under his command and Mukai not having yet betrayed him, everything is going according to his plan at this point. However, Riki-Oh cuts the machines out of his body, enabling him to ignore Washizaki's commands. When Washizaki fights Riki-Oh later in his insane state, he takes massive damage as Riki-Oh cuts him open with a punch, causing several of his internal organs to go flying out of his body. Somehow, Washizaki survives this and is able to keep fighting. Washizaki tries to convince Riki-Oh that what he is doing is for the greater good by trying to kill Nachi, but given Washizaki's insanity, it makes Riki-Oh want to do the opposite if anything. After Washizaki's failed attempt to kill him, Nachi betrays Washizaki, vaporizing him with an energy beam. Washizaki is regularly remembered by Riki-Oh throughout the story, as he compares his ideology to several other villains later on in the series as his face shows up behind Riki-Oh in the panel. His insane actions during his rampage make considerably more sense after seeing Mukai's plan. Washizaki was also the inspiration for the final boss from Street Fighter II, M. Bison AKA Vega (ベガ, Bega?), sharing very similar designs. In addition, they are both often usurped by greater villains, Mukai and Nachi in Washizaki's case, and Akuma in M. Bison's case.

A cyborg weighing 300 kg (661.4 lbs) who wasn't viewed by anyone other than Riki-oh as a real person.
Originally he was a slave robot constructed from a human body. Becoming this way allowed him to work in a power plant in the Cape, an environment too intense for non-cybernetic humans. After realising that he was only being used by humans for his strength, he led a revolt against The Cape's government, only for his rebellion to be put down. After this, he volunteered as fighter in the Pankration, a death match show, in the hopes that it would give him the strength to get revenge on humanity for what they did to him. Quickly befriending Riki-Oh, he is forced to fight him a short while afterwards, and is saved by the latter after Nachi tries to kill him by dropping the ring on top of his body. Realising his real enemy is Washizaki, he declares his humanity as he charges the general, only to be bisected vertically by his sword.

A scientist at the dependence of Aneyama.

He's the chief charged with the accomplishment of a plan whose goal is to accelerate the coming of Judgement Day. In order to achieve this goal, he needs to give birth to the so-called "child of destruction", a being created from the union of Nachi's head with the body of Riki-Oh.

A Chinese man who stopped Riki's suicide attempt in front of his mother's grave, he later became Riki's sensei whom taught him the art of Qigong. He used to be Chiang Kai-shek's elite bodyguard.

Riki-Oh and Nachi's biological mother, she was executed by hanging for allegedly poisoning thirteen infants twenty-five years ago. Before her death sentence, with help from a friend, Riki and Nachi managed to escape from prison. She foretold that one day her death will be avenged by her son and that evil will never conquer the good. Although Jewish and Japanese, she uses a Chinese name. Her birth name was Hanna, and was raised in Shanghai with her foster family.

Media

Anime
Riki-oh was released as two OVAs. The first anime was called Riki-oh: The Wall of Hell (1989). The second one was titled Riki-oh: Child of Destruction (1990). The first OVA is a softened retelling of the Prison Arc, and the second, an adaptation of the Cape Arc, focuses on Riki's adventure to find his brother, Nachi, and stop his devilish cult following. Media Blasters acquired the rights to rerelease the two OVAs in the United States on DVD on April 11, 2006, but has since let go of the licenses.

Live-action film

In 1991, a Hong Kong live-action adaptation titled Riki-Oh: The Story of Ricky was released. The film was directed by Lam Nai-choi and stars Fan Siu-Wong as Ricky Ho. Ricky-Oh: The Story of Ricky was first released in the U.S. on DVD in 2000 by Media Blasters under their Tokyo Shock label. Media Blasters released the film on Blu-ray in 2011.

Legacy
Riki-Oh was the primary source of inspiration for the design of M. Bison in the Street Fighter series of fighting games. His design came from the character General Washizaki, one of the main villains of Riki-Oh.

Riki-Oh has also been cited as an influence on the Mortal Kombat series of fighting games. Similarities include the gory fatality finishing moves, the resemblance between Ricky and Liu Kang, and the X-ray attacks.

References

External links
Business Jump Riki-Oh page (Archived from the original on 2007-12-26. Retrieved 2016-02-12.)
Japanese Language Fan Site (Archived from the original on 2013-12-03. Retrieved 2016-02-12.)

1983 manga
1989 anime OVAs
1990 anime OVAs
Manga adapted into films
Martial arts anime and manga
Seinen manga
Shueisha franchises
Shueisha manga
Magic Bus (studio)